The 1976–77 season was Manchester City's 75th season of competitive football and 57th season in the top division of English football. In addition to the First Division, the club competed in the FA Cup, Football League Cup, UEFA Cup and the Tennent Caledonian Cup.

First Division

League table

Results summary

References

External links

Manchester City F.C. seasons
Manchester City